James C. Officer (1859–1910) was a member of the Wisconsin State Senate.

Biography
Officer was born on January 23, 1859, in Vernon County, Wisconsin, as the oldest child of Mary Ann Spencer and Elias Crumbaker Officer. He graduated from the University of Wisconsin-Madison in 1884 and the University of Wisconsin Law School in 1886. Officer died at the age of 50 on January 1, 1910, and is interred in Springville, Wisconsin.

Career
Officer was elected to the Senate in 1894. He was a Republican.

References

1859 births
1910 deaths
People from Vernon County, Wisconsin
Republican Party Wisconsin state senators
University of Wisconsin–Madison alumni
University of Wisconsin Law School alumni